Bahuwa is a town and a nagar panchayat in Fatehpur district  in the state of Uttar Pradesh, India.

Demographics
 India census, Bahuwa had a population of 9312. Males constitute 53% of the population and females 47%. Bahuwa has an average literacy rate of 53%, lower than the national average of 59.5%; with 62% of the males and 38% of females literate. 15% of the population is under 6 years of age.

References

Cities and towns in Fatehpur district